Elegantly Wasted is the tenth studio album by Australian rock band INXS. It was released in April 1997, and is the final album recorded with lead singer Michael Hutchence before his death in November that same year.

The band had spent April 1996 rehearsing in London and moved over to Vancouver to record with producer Bruce Fairbairn the same month. Production of the album was completed by Hutchence and songwriter and multi-instrumentalist Andrew Farriss in Spain later the same year. Two songs that did not make the final cut of the album were included on the Bang the Drum EP (2004).

The album's title is from Hutchence, with the single itself trying to recapture the magic and groove of the Kick album, particularly the single, "Need You Tonight".

All three Farriss brothers dedicated the album to their mother, Jill, who died in 1995.

Background
In June 1994, INXS ended their US contract with Atlantic Records, and signed a new worldwide record deal with PolyGram/Mercury Records; however, the group agreed to release one final record through the Atlantic label - The Greatest Hits. Released several months later on 31 October, the compilation included two new songs: "The Strangest Party (These Are the Times)" and "Deliver Me".

After a long break, INXS reconvened in 1996 to record their tenth studio album, Elegantly Wasted, their last with Hutchence. In 1995, Hutchence already began work on his self-titled solo album; the project was put on hold until Elegantly Wasted was completed. In an interview with The Album Network magazine in March 1997, Hutchence said, "We really wanted to get off the old carousel for a while. As a band, we have recorded an album every twelve to eighteen months over the last five or six years. This helped to create a situation resulting in a lot of personal and business friction within the band, as well as the record label, at the time of the completion of our last studio album Full Moon, Dirty Hearts. With the completion of the album, we also fulfilled our contract with Atlantic Records. So, it just seemed like the logical time to take a break".

PolyGram studios in London paired the band with Canadian producer Bruce Fairbairn, their first and only collaboration.

Recording and production
With both Hutchence and Farriss living in London, the songwriting duo first started talking about a new record over the phone. After spending months talking about new ideas, the pair finally got together, and began working on new material. Using 24-track reels and ADAT (Alesis Digital Audio Tape) recorders, the pair put together a handful of demo tapes, which included an early version of the song "Searching". The remaining members of INXS flew out to meet Hutchence and Farriss in London. When the entire group got together, they began rehearsing the material that had been previously recorded by Hutchence and Farriss. The rehearsals began in April 1996. While visiting friends Bono and Larry Mullen Jr. from U2 in Dublin during mid-1996, Hutchence and Farriss rented a small studio where they continued working on the album. They put the finishing touches on the existing demo tapes, as well as compose new recordings. One of the first songs to be completed during these sessions was "Searching". The band first previewed the song live at the Australian ARIA Music Awards in September 1996.

Before meeting with Fairbairn, the band sent him all the material they had been working on. Fairbairn had just finished working with Irish rock band, The Cranberries. Upon receiving the material Fairbairn commented, "I was impressed with the feel and the different sounds that they'd been using." He added, "I actually ended up suggesting that we might want to save some of the stuff on the demos – because the chances were that when we were back in the studio we wouldn't be able to recreate that vibe". After listening to the material, Fairbairn flew to London to meet with the band. He spent a few afternoons with Hutchence and Farriss discussing the project. A date was set for production at Fairbairn's own recording studio in Vancouver, with both himself and Farriss producing. When later asked about his role in the production of Elegantly Wasted, Fairbairn said, "Well, I didn't really co-produce with the band, but the record was produced with Andrew Farriss. Andrew was certainly a player at the demo stage, and as we ended up keeping some of the stuff on the demos I felt that it was fair to recognise his contribution in some way".

The band first arrived at the Armoury studio in Vancouver in late April 1996 to begin the recording sessions. Most of the demos that were brought out to Vancouver had to be reorganised, taking out and discarding certain parts, as well as adding in new drum beats and bass lines. Some members of the band had to provide overdubbing on the existing demos, including Hutchence who recorded new overdubs on the vocals. Most of the album was recorded digitally; the drums, bass and guitar on the tracks "Girl on Fire", "We Are Thrown Together" and "Bang the Drum"
(dropped during production) were recorded using analogue equipment. Farris and Hutchence finished the album later in 1996. Additional musicians were brought in to provide backing vocals on "Don't Lose Your Head", "Searching" and "I'm Just a Man". After the sessions in Spain had wrapped, the recordings were returned to Vancouver, where engineer Mike Plotnikoff began the initial mixing, before sending them to Townhouse Studios in London, where music producer Tom Lord-Alge carried out the bulk of the mixing. Plotnikoff recalls, "I did a mix for him [Lord-Alge] beforehand in Vancouver so that he had a guideline as to roughly what we wanted".

Tour
INXS embarked on their 20th anniversary tour in support for Elegantly Wasted, beginning with a string of warm-up dates in the US on 17 April 1997 at the Irving Plaza in New York. During their time in New York, the band were asked to appear on numerous talk shows to perform the album's brand new single, "Elegantly Wasted", including the Rosie O'Donnell show on 16 April and the Late Show with David Letterman on 22 April. The group would play three more shows in cities across North America, finishing up at the Mayan Theater in Los Angeles, California on 24 April.

The first leg of the international tour brought the band to South Africa, their first and only tour of the country. A few days before playing their first show at the 3 Arts Theatre in Cape Town on 29 May, the band was hurriedly asked by the producers of Face/Off to shoot a music video for the album's third single, "Don't Lose Your Head". The video was shot by long-time collaborator and friend Nick Egan, inside a large plane hangar on an airstrip located in Cape Town. After playing a show in Durban, the group travelled up to Johannesburg to play three shows at the Ellis Park Arena (formerly known as the Standard Bank Arena) beginning on 3 June and finishing on 5 June. The tour continued across Europe where the band played various arenas and festivals beginning 9 June at the Barrowland ballroom in Glasgow, Scotland, and ending on 5 July at the Midtfyns Festival in Ringe, Denmark.

INXS returned to the US on 11 July where they played eight shows along the West Coast. In late August, the band started making their way across the Midwest. The itinerary included visits to Chicago, Illinois, Minneapolis, Minnesota and Kansas City, Missouri. A show in Milwaukee, Wisconsin was cancelled on 27 August after it was reported in a newspaper that Hutchence had sprained his ankle. On 31 August, the tour moved north into Canada, with shows being played in Montreal, Quebec and Toronto, Ontario. While playing a show in Montreal, Nicolas Cage was spotted by fans in the VIP balcony near the stage. Hutchence dedicated "What You Need" and "Don't Lose Your Head" (used in Cage's movie Face/Off) to the actor. Their last concert with Hutchence was at the Star Lake Amphitheatre in Burgettstown, PA on 27 September.

In November, the band returned to Sydney, Australia to prepare for their homecoming tour. Before setting off on a thirteen-date trek around Australia on 23 November, the band set up for rehearsal sessions at ABC Studios. The homecoming tour was quickly cancelled when the death of Hutchence was announced on 22 November.

Packaging
A mini video shoot was specially shot and directed for the album's cinematic album art. The entire video shoot was directed and photographed by Danish photographer Pierre Winther in locations around California in 1996. Winther, famous for his filmic visionary manages to tell a complex story in each of his staged shots; the front cover for Elegantly Wasted shows a dramatic shot of the band caught up in a cinematic setting where it appears that an attractive girl has emerged safely from a car accident, just under the viaduct at 635-651 S Anderson St, downtown Los Angeles (which no longer exists). A different photograph of the girl getting out of the car was shot and used as the artwork for the "Elegantly Wasted" single. The same girl can be seen wandering the streets of San Francisco in the music video for the album's second single, "Searching". The album's accompanying booklet contains additional photography of the band near the Edwards Air Force Base in the Californian desert. The artwork for the singles, "Searching" and "Everything" feature photographs as the cover art, which were also taken in the Californian desert.

Only three songs from the track listing had lyrics printed in the liner notes; "Elegantly Wasted", "Show Me (Cherry Baby)" and "Shake the Tree".

Reception

Reviews for the album were mixed. Rolling Stone, Q and AllMusic all rated the album two stars, with Stephen Thomas Erlewine writing in his AllMusic review, "The band does dabble in contemporary dance on Elegantly Wasted, but it all comes out sounding like the lite funk-n-roll of Kick, only without the energy. And without the tunes". In her review for Rolling Stone, Elysa Gardner said that the album "seems like an exercise in nostalgia", and added, "the sinuous dance grooves and crackling bursts of guitar in new songs such as "Elegantly Wasted" and "Don't Lose Your Head" don't seem very fresh".

In a more enthusiastic review, Entertainment Weekly scored the album an "A", and wrote, "The Jaggersque vocal yowl of Michael Hutchence, matched to the spiky James Brown funk of the Farriss brothers, gives their new melodies swing and tone". GQ also gave the album a favorable review calling Elegantly Wasted "vibrant" and "exciting", and concluded that "The '80s revival starts here".

Commercial performance
The album did not perform as well as anticipated. In the US it only reached number 41 on the Billboard Top 200. It did perform better outside the US peaking at number 14 in both Canada and Australia, and number 16 in the United Kingdom. Elegantly Wasted was certified Gold in Canada on 9 May 1997 having sold 50,000 copies.

Track listing

Personnel 
Personnel as listed in the album's liner notes are:

INXS
 Michael Hutchence – vocals, guitar (10)
 Andrew Farriss – keyboards, guitars
 Tim Farriss – guitars
 Kirk Pengilly – guitars, saxophone
 Gary Beers – bass 
 Jon Farriss – drums

Additional musicians
 Luis Conte – percussion 
 Bill Runge – baritone saxophone (7)
 Tom Keenlyside – tenor saxophone (7), horn arrangements (7)
 Paul Baron – trumpet (7)
 Derry Byrne – trumpet (7)
 Joani Bye – backing vocals (4, 5)
 Tania Hancheroff – backing vocals (4, 5)
 Billie Godfrey – backing vocals (6)
 Caroline MacKendrick – backing vocals (6)

Production 
 Bruce Fairbairn – producer
 Andrew Farriss – producer
 Richard Guy – engineer
 Mike Plotnikoff – engineer
 Delwyn Brooks – second engineer
 Paul Silveria – assistant engineer
 Tom Lord-Alge – mixing 
 Julie Gardner – mix assistant 
 George Marino – mastering at Sterling Sound (New York, NY)
 Paul Craig – A&R, management
 Martha Troup – management
 David Edwards – production coordinator
 Christina de la Sala – production coordinator
 Mat Cook at Intro – design concept, art direction
 David Smith – design
 Pierre Winther – art direction, photography
 Sound Management Associates – management company

Charts and certifications

Weekly charts

Sales and certifications

|-

References

1997 albums
INXS albums
Mercury Records albums
Albums produced by Bruce Fairbairn
Albums recorded at Armoury Studios